"Wanna Hold You" is a song by the English rock band the Rolling Stones on their 1983 album Undercover.

Although credited to Mick Jagger and Keith Richards, "Wanna Hold You" is largely a Richards composition. The song was written in a recording studio in Paris in the basement of a house of one of Richards' acquaintances. Richards describes the song's structure as being "very early sort of Lennon & McCartney, let alone the title, which suggest "I Want to Hold Your Hand". The first recording of the song, of which Richards claims to have the original tape, had only Richards on guitar and vocals and Jagger on drums.

The lyrics deal with the often-used topic of a poor man having nothing but love to give to a woman, as the following line illustrates:

During the Rolling Stones' Bridges To Babylon Tour, "Wanna Hold You" was a regular part of the mini-set sung by Richards and was performed 99 times (of 107 concerts in total).

References

The Rolling Stones songs
1983 songs
Songs written by Jagger–Richards
Song recordings produced by Jagger–Richards
Song recordings produced by Chris Kimsey